The Military Man is a 2014 Canadian drama film starring Laurent Lucas, written and directed by Noël Mitrani.

Plot 
A former French soldier lives in solitude in Montreal. Since returning from Afghanistan with a leg injury, this soldier has had trouble coming to grips with reality and overcoming his loneliness. The trauma caused by his memories of the conflict leads him towards an unhealthy relationship with women. One day, his behavior brings him into contact with a woman and makes him questions his motives.

Cast 
 Laurent Lucas as Bertrand
 Noémie Godin-Vigneau as Audrey
 Larry Day
 Harry Standjofski

Production
The film is an independent feature shot on super 16 mm like a documentary. For the role, Laurent Lucas specially grew his beard and shaved his head. The film was shot on location in Montreal with a very small crew.

External links 
 
  
 FNC (Review) 
 Review (French) 

2014 films
Canadian drama films
Films set in Montreal
War in Afghanistan (2001–2021) films
Films directed by Noël Mitrani
French-language Canadian films
2010s Canadian films